"Far From Yours" is the title of a top twenty rap single by O.C. featuring Yvette Michele. The single peaked at number 12 US Billboard Rap singles chart. Billboard magazine remarked: "easy-paced jeep groove with an on-point rap that leaves the listener salivating for much more".

Track listing
A1: Far From Yours (Clean) (4:04)

A2: Far From Yours (Instrumental) (4:18)

A3: Far From Yours (Not So Clean) (4:18)

B1: My World (Clean) (4:16)

B2: My World (Street) (4:16)

B3: My World (Instrumental) (4:16)

My World is produced by DJ Premier.

Chart positions

References

1997 singles
1997 songs
RCA Records singles
Yvette Michele songs